Feti Okuroglu (born 5 August 1971) is a former Turkish footballer who played as a centre-back for Galatasaray  and the Turkey national team.

Honours

Galatasaray
Turkish Cup: 1995–96

References

1971 births
Living people
Süper Lig players
Bursaspor footballers
Trabzonspor footballers
Karşıyaka S.K. footballers
Galatasaray S.K. footballers
İzmirspor footballers
Turkey youth international footballers
Turkey under-21 international footballers
Turkey international footballers
Competitors at the 1991 Mediterranean Games
Association football defenders
Mediterranean Games medalists in football
Mediterranean Games gold medalists for Turkey
Mediterranean Games silver medalists for Turkey
Turkish footballers